The 2015 Royal Lahaina Challenger was a professional tennis tournament played on hard courts. It was the sixth edition of the tournament which was part of the 2015 ATP Challenger Tour. It took place in Maui, United States between 25 January and 1 February 2015.

Singles main-draw entrants

Seeds

 1 Rankings are as of January 19, 2015.

Other entrants
The following players received wildcards into the singles main draw:
  Thibaud Berland
  Stefan Kozlov
  Mitchell Krueger
  Marko Lenz

The following players received entry from the qualifying draw:
  Wang Chuhan
  Takanyi Garanganga
  Nicolas Meister
  Sekou Bangoura

The following players received entry through the use of a protected ranking:
  Ryan Sweeting

Champions

Singles

 Jared Donaldson def.  Nicolas Meister, 6–1, 6–4

Doubles

 Jared Donaldson /  Stefan Kozlov def.  Chase Buchanan /  Rhyne Williams, 6–3, 6–4

External links
Official Website

2015 ATP Challenger Tour
ATP Challengers in Hawaii
2015 in sports in Hawaii
2015 in American tennis
January 2015 sports events in Oceania
February 2015 sports events in Oceania